The 1966 ICF Canoe Sprint World Championships were held in the East Berlin suburb of Grünau in East Germany. This event was held under the auspices of the International Canoe Federation. From 19 to 21 August, competitors used the regatta course on the Langer See that had previously been used for the canoeing and rowing events at the 1936 Summer Olympics.

The men's competition consisted of four Canadian (single paddle, open boat) and nine kayak events. Three events were held for the women, all in kayak. This was the first championships which had one competitor or team per nation per event, a rule that continues .

It was also the seventh championships in canoe sprint.

Medal summary

Men's

Canoe

Kayak

Women's

Kayak

Medals table

References

ICF medalists for Olympic and World Championships - Part 1: flatwater (now sprint): 1936–2007.
ICF medalists for Olympic and World Championships - Part 2: rest of flatwater (now sprint) and remaining canoeing disciplines: 1936-2007.
Results at Canoeresults.eu

Icf Canoe Sprint World Championships, 1966
Icf Canoe Sprint World Championships, 1966
ICF Canoe Sprint World Championships
International sports competitions hosted by East Germany
Canoeing and kayaking competitions in Germany
August 1966 sports events in Europe